James Slayton (born October 1, 1998) is an American soccer player who plays as a goalkeeper for the Hartford Athletic in the USL Championship.

Career

College & Amateur
Slayton attended the University of Hartford, making 74 appearances and registering 21 shutouts across his four years at the school.

While at college, Slayton appeared in the USL League Two with Ocean City Nor'easters in 2017 and 2018 and Western Mass Pioneers in 2019.

Real Monarchs
In January 2020, Slayton joined Real Salt Lake's USL Championship side Real Monarchs. He made his league debut for the club on July 11, 2020, in a home match against the San Diego Loyal.

References

External links
Jimmy Slayton at Real Salt Lake Official Website

1998 births
Living people
Hartford Hawks men's soccer players
Ocean City Nor'easters players
Western Mass Pioneers players
Real Monarchs players
USL League Two players
USL Championship players
American soccer players
Association football goalkeepers
Soccer players from Connecticut